Qaleh Beyg Qarah Cheshmeh (also Romanized as Qal‘eh Beyg Qarah Cheshmeh; also known as Qal‘eh Beyg, Beyg, and Qal‘eh Bīg) is a village in Sivkanlu Rural District, in the Central District of Shirvan County, North Khorasan Province, Iran. At the 2006 census, its population was 435, in 112 families.

The old village is north of the city of Shirvan, dating back more than 300 years, and its people speak Kurdish (Kermani).
The population of this village is divided into three different clans, including: Kalajan, Shamalian and Thayan (Tayanlou).

Famous people of this village have been recorded in different periods of history. The most prominent person in the history of this village is Ismail Ghorbanian, who was one of the greatest commanders in the Nadir Shah's era, and was the only one in the Nadir Shah armies who never bowed to him. American historian Harold Lamb has mentioned this person in his book.

References 

Populated places in Shirvan County